Pangeran Ratu Winata Kusuma of Sambas (Official name Pangeran Ratu Winata Kusuma ibni al-Marhum Pangeran Ratu Muhammad Taufik; 25 September 1965 – 1 February 2008) is a sultan of Sambas. A traditional state which a town part of West Kalimantan, Indonesia. He died from his complication disease which attacked him.

External links
  Sultan of Sambas died

1965 births
2008 deaths
Indonesian people of Malay descent